Lindsay Davenport and Lisa Raymond were the defending champions but they competed with different partners that year, Davenport with Mary Joe Fernández and Raymond with Rennae Stubbs.

Davenport and Fernandez lost in the quarterfinals to Elizabeth Smylie and Linda Wild.

Raymond and Stubbs lost in the semifinals to Julie Halard-Decugis and Nathalie Tauziat.

Chanda Rubin and Brenda Schultz-McCarthy won in the final 6–1, 6–4 against Halard-Decugis and Tauziat.

Seeds
Champion seeds are indicated in bold text while text in italics indicates the round in which those seeds were eliminated. The top four seeded teams received byes into the second round.

Draw

Final

Top half

Bottom half

References
 1996 State Farm Evert Cup Doubles Draw

Doubles
1996 Newsweek Champions Cup and the State Farm Evert Cup